Vanished – Left Behind: Next Generation is a 2016 American action-adventure drama film directed by Larry A. McLean, with a screenplay written by Kim Beyer-Johnson and Joan Considine Johnson. It stars Amber Frank, Mason Dye, Dylan Sprayberry and Tom Everett Scott. It is based on the book Left Behind: The Kids by Tim LaHaye and Jerry B. Jenkins and serves as a spin-off from the Left Behind film series.

The film was released selected theaters on September 28, 2016 and was released on DVD on November 17, 2016.

Premise
After a billion people vanish, Gabby, a 15-year-old girl, suddenly has to take care of her little sister. Gabby, her sister, and two teens vying for her attention try to figure out what happened as they survive in a new world.

Cast
 Amber Frank as Gabby Harlow 
 Mason Dye as Josh Jackson
 Dylan Sprayberry as Flynn
 Tom Everett Scott as Damon
 Jackson Hurst as Eric Harlow  
 Brigid Brannagh as Sarah  
 Keely Wilson as Claire Harlow  
 Rachel Hendrix as Rachel  
 Randy LaHaye as Nicolae Carpathia  
 Tara Erickson as Screaming Mom  
 Chip Lane as Rex Hargrove
 Dr. Tony Evans as Pastor Vernon Billings
 William Gabriel Grier as Associate Pastor Bruce Barnes

References

External links
 
 

2016 films
American drama films
2010s coming-of-age films
American action adventure films
American aviation films
American disaster films
American fantasy films
Apocalyptic films
Films about siblings
2010s English-language films
Film spin-offs
Films based on American novels
Christian apocalyptic films
Teen adventure films
Left Behind series
2010s teen fantasy films
2010s American films